Roberto Dueñas Hernandez (born 1 November 1975) is a retired Spanish professional basketball player.

Professional career
Dueñas was drafted with the last overall pick (#57), of the 1997 NBA draft, by the Chicago Bulls, but he never played in the NBA.

Dueñas played professionally with FC Barcelona from 1996–2005, during which time he won a EuroLeague championship in the 2002–03 season. In honor of his play with Barcelona, his #12 jersey number was retired.

Spain national team
Dueñas was a member of the senior Spain national basketball team. He played at the 2000 Summer Olympics and the 2004 Summer Olympics with Spain.

External links 
Spanish League Profile 

1975 births
Living people
Baloncesto Fuenlabrada players
Basketball players at the 2000 Summer Olympics
Basketball players at the 2004 Summer Olympics
CB Girona players
CB Prat players
Centers (basketball)
Chicago Bulls draft picks
FC Barcelona Bàsquet players
Joventut Badalona players
Liga ACB players
Olympic basketball players of Spain
Spanish men's basketball players
1998 FIBA World Championship players
Basketball players from Madrid